Xu Wenlong (born February 27, 1987) is a Chinese cross-country skier who has competed since 2007. At the 2010 Winter Olympics in Vancouver, he finished 19th in the team sprint and 68th in the individual sprint event.

He won the men's 10 km qualifying event at the FIS Nordic World Ski Championships 2009 in Liberec, Czech Republic.

Xu's best World Cup finish was 23rd in a 15 km event at Changchun in 2007. His best overall finish second in a 50 km race, also in Changchun, in early 2009.

References

1987 births
Chinese male cross-country skiers
Tour de Ski skiers
Cross-country skiers at the 2010 Winter Olympics
Cross-country skiers at the 2014 Winter Olympics
Living people
Olympic cross-country skiers of China
Skiers from Harbin